Matej Tóth (born 10 February 1983) is a Slovak race walker. He is a former Olympic champion in the 50 km walk.

Career 
Toth won the gold medal in the 50 km walk at the 2010 IAAF World Race Walking Cup, and at the 2015 World Championships, taking Slovakia's first ever gold at the championships.

He finished first at the 2016 Olympic Games in 50 km walk, winning the first Slovak Olympic medal in athletics and also being the first Slovak gold medalist in a Summer sport other than canoe slalom.

He was the 2016 Slovak Athlete of the Year.

In 2018, he won silver medal in the men's 50 kilometres walk at the 2018 European Athletics Championships held in Berlin, Germany. In 2019, he competed in the men's 50 kilometres walk at the 2019 World Athletics Championships held in Doha, Qatar. He did not finish his race.

Toth represented Slovakia at the 2020 Summer Olympics and finished 14th in the men's 50 kilometres walk with a season best.

He is a journalist by education.

Achievements

References

External links
 
 
 
 
 Matej Tóth at the Slovenský Olympijský Výbor (Rio 2016) 

1983 births
Living people
Slovak male racewalkers
Athletes (track and field) at the 2004 Summer Olympics
Athletes (track and field) at the 2008 Summer Olympics
Athletes (track and field) at the 2012 Summer Olympics
Athletes (track and field) at the 2016 Summer Olympics
Olympic athletes of Slovakia
Sportspeople from Nitra
World Athletics Championships athletes for Slovakia
European Championships (multi-sport event) silver medalists
European Athletics Championships medalists
World Athletics Championships medalists
Olympic gold medalists for Slovakia
Olympic gold medalists in athletics (track and field)
Medalists at the 2016 Summer Olympics
Olympic male racewalkers
World Athletics Race Walking Team Championships winners
World Athletics Championships winners
Athletes (track and field) at the 2020 Summer Olympics